Şafak is a word in Turkish meaning dawn. It is also used as a unisex given name and a surname. Notable people with the name include:

Given name 
 Şafak Edge (born 1992), Turkish basketball player 
 Şafak Pavey (born 1976), Turkish politician 
 Şafak Sezer (born 1970), Turkish actor

Surname 
 Elif Şafak (born 1971), Turkish writer

References

Turkish-language surnames
Turkish unisex given names
Surnames from given names